Noel Anderson (born 16 September 1938) is  a former Australian rules footballer who played with North Melbourne and Richmond in the Victorian Football League (VFL).

Family
He is the brother of Richmond footballer Bernie Anderson.

Notes

References
 Hogan P: The Tigers Of Old, Richmond FC, (Melbourne), 1996.

External links 		
		
		
				
		
Living people		
1938 births			
Australian rules footballers from Victoria (Australia)		
North Melbourne Football Club players		
Richmond Football Club players